The Imperial War Cabinet (IWC) was the British Empire's wartime coordinating body. It met over three sessions, the first from 20 March to 2 May 1917, the second from 11 June to late July 1918, and the third from 20 or 25 November 1918 to early January 1919. Consisting of representatives from Canada, Australia, India, the Dominion of Newfoundland, New Zealand, South Africa and the United Kingdom, the Cabinet considered many aspects of waging the First World War. It led to the United Kingdom's Dominions being considered more equal to Great Britain. Held concurrently with the cabinet were the Imperial War Conferences of 1917 and 1918.

Background 

In 1887, the First Colonial Conference was held. It was organised at the behest of the Imperial Federation League in hopes of creating closer ties between the colonies and the United Kingdom. It was attended by more than 100 delegates, mostly unofficial observers, from both self-governing and dependent colonies. India, however, was not represented. Further Colonial Conferences (later Imperial Conferences) were held in 1894, 1897, 1902, 1907 and 1911. The British Empire was ill prepared upon the outbreak of World War I for land warfare, consisting of a small professional force with 247,432 regular troops. David Lloyd George was named Minister of Munitions in 1915 and played a large role helping wage the war. He became Prime Minister of the United Kingdom on 7 December 1916. The purpose of the Imperial War Cabinet was to bring Britains important Dominions and India up to the same status as the mother country to discuss war strategy, and to further the cause of Imperial Federation.

Meetings 

On 14 December 1916, Lloyd George cabled all countries in the British Empire, informing them that "Your Prime Minister will be a member of the War Cabinet." Jan Smuts arrived on 12 March 1917, to large crowds. Robert Borden secretly departed and arrived in February 1917, and all of the involved Prime Ministers were present by 20 March 1917 (with the exception of Billy Hughes of Australia), and the first meeting of the Imperial War Cabinet was held. Lloyd George said that formation of the cabinet marked "the beginning of a new epoch in the history of the Empire," and The Times wrote the following day:

Though led by the British Prime Minister primus inter pares (and in his absence the Prime Minister of Canada), the countries involved were largely treated as equals. Between 20 March and 2 May 1917, the cabinet had 14 meetings, with involved prime ministers splitting their time between the cabinet and the concurrently running Imperial War Conferences. Proceedings of the cabinet were secret, but it is thought that "much of the energy of the War Cabinet was devoted to the grave question of increasing the number of troops available." The British War Cabinet continued to make most strategic decisions. Jan Smuts attended the meetings of the British War Cabinet after the disbanding of the IWC.

The Imperial War Cabinet met again on 11 June 1918, with a gathering in the Royal Gallery on 21 June marking the arrival of thirteen current and former Prime Ministers. The Cabinet engaged in many policy decisions, including asking Canada to send troops to Siberia, and travelling to a meeting of the Supreme War Council on 4 or 5 July and later on 3 December. The IWC decided that Prime Ministers of the Dominions had a right to communicated directly with the British Prime Minister. After six weeks, the cabinet disbanded in late July 1918. A "minister of cabinet rank" from all represented Dominions remained in London for the duration of the war.

On 27 October, the IWC was called together to help discuss the peace settlement, and on 20 or 25 November the cabinet began its third session (though without representatives from New Zealand and India, and South African Representatives didn't arrive until 16 December). It considered the terms of the Armistice of 11 November 1918 and on 3 December the cabinet heard Marshal Foch and Georges Clemenceau. Through the rest of December, the IWC would confer with Vittorio Emanuele Orlando, Sidney Sonnino and Woodrow Wilson. In January 1919, the cabinet's operations were largely transferred to France as the British Empire delegation.

Participants

See also 

 Committee of Imperial Defence
 Commonwealth Heads of Government Meeting
 Lloyd George ministry

Footnotes 
Notes

Sources

References 

 National Archives Glossary
 
 

 
 
 
 
 

Governance of the British Empire
British Empire in World War I
Events in the British Empire
1917 in international relations
1918 in international relations
1919 in international relations
20th-century diplomatic conferences
Diplomatic conferences in the United Kingdom
1917 in the British Empire
1918 in the British Empire
1919 in the British Empire
David Lloyd George
Bonar Law
Jan Smuts